The canton of Carignan is an administrative division of the Ardennes department, northern France. Its borders were modified at the French canton reorganisation which came into effect in March 2015. Its seat is in Carignan.

It consists of the following communes:

Auflance
Autrecourt-et-Pourron
Beaumont-en-Argonne
Bièvres
Blagny
Brévilly
Carignan
Les Deux-Villes
Douzy
Escombres-et-le-Chesnois
Euilly-et-Lombut
La Ferté-sur-Chiers
Fromy
Herbeuval
Létanne
Linay
Malandry
Margny
Margut
Matton-et-Clémency
Messincourt
Mogues
Moiry
Mouzon
Osnes
Puilly-et-Charbeaux
Pure
Sachy
Sailly
Sapogne-sur-Marche
Signy-Montlibert
Tétaigne
Tremblois-lès-Carignan
Vaux-lès-Mouzon
Villers-devant-Mouzon
Villy
Williers
Yoncq

References

Cantons of Ardennes (department)